An Irrevocable Fee Protection Agreement (IFPA) is generally applied to an over-the-counter commodity transaction. It is an irrevocable and binding legal agreement between a buyer, a seller and a business broker.

In an IFPA, the objective is to reach a private agreement for the placement or purchase of a commodity or other piece of merchandise that has been clearly identified and negotiated in bulk. The buyer or seller offers a private business broker a fee (either a fixed sum or percentage) for arranging the transaction. The fee is only paid if and when the transaction is completed. The commission and when it will be paid is determined by the aforementioned fee agreement. Usually, the fees are automatically transferred from the buyer's bank account to the business broker when the buyer pays for the product.

Commodity markets